"Love Drunk" is a song and debut single by R&B singer Loick Essien, released on 12 September 2010 by Sony Music Entertainment. Featuring uncredited vocals from Labrinth, it was the first single released from Essien's debut album Identity. The song entered the UK Singles Chart at number 57. The remix version features British rapper Bashy.

Music video
The video was filmed in London September 2010. It was uploaded to YouTube on 16 January 2011.

Track listing

Chart performance

Release history

References

2010 singles
2010 songs
Loick Essien songs
Song recordings produced by Labrinth
Songs written by Loick Essien
Sony Music singles